Wardhouse railway station served the area of Wardhouse, Aberdeenshire, Scotland from 1854 to 1961 on the Great North of Scotland Railway.

History 
The station opened on 1 December 1854 by the Great North of Scotland Railway. It was originally built for Pedro Carlos Gordon, who lived in a nearby mansion. A second platform was added in 1889. A gate box opened when the line was doubled in 1896. It became a full box in 1898, downgraded to a gate box in 1915, upgraded to a full box again in 1920 and demoted to a gate box on 1931. It closed to both passengers and goods traffic on 5 June 1961.

References

External links 

Disused railway stations in Aberdeenshire
Former Great North of Scotland Railway stations
Railway stations in Great Britain opened in 1854
Railway stations in Great Britain closed in 1961
1854 establishments in Scotland
1961 disestablishments in Scotland